This is a list of electoral results for the electoral district of Barwon in Victorian state elections.

Members for Barwon

Election results

Elections in the 1950s

Elections in the 1940s

Elections in the 1930s

 Preferences were not distributed.

Elections in the 1920s

 Preferences were not distributed.

 Edward Morley was elected in the 1920 election as an Independent Nationalist, but joined the Nationalists before this election.

Elections in the 1910s

References

Victoria (Australia) state electoral results by district